Charles Long (born April 6, 1938 – December 16, 1989) was an American football offensive tackle and guard. He played college football for the University of Tennessee at Chattanooga. In 1961, he joined the Boston Patriots of the American Football League (AFL). He played there for nine seasons and was a two-time AFL All-Star selection, and a member of the Patriots' All-1960s (AFL) Team.

See also
 List of American Football League players

References

1938 births
1989 deaths
American football offensive linemen
Boston Patriots players
Chattanooga Mocs football players
American Football League All-Star players
Players of American football from Alabama
People from DeKalb County, Alabama
American Football League players